Robert Waddell may refer to:

 Rob Waddell (born 1975), New Zealand rower, and yachtsman
 R. Bruce Waddell (1914–1979), American politician
 Bobby Waddell (1939–2021), Scottish footballer